Emanuel Sejr (29 September 1891 – 17 January 1980) was a Danish librarian, author and local historian who was the head librarian of the Danish State and University Library. Sejr was hired by the State and University Library in 1913 and became the head librarian in 1936 to 1957. In the 1920s he played a key role in the negotiations to have the library serve double functions as both a state library and the university library for Aarhus University. He also secured development and construction of the new building ("Bogtårnet") (English: Book tower) on the university campus. During retirement Sejr dedicated himself to local history and published a number of book about local subjects such as the university, theatre and people from the city. Sejr through his life accumulated a large archive of 110,000 of mainly newspaper clippings which is still used today for historical research.

Books  
 Fra Smakke til Hurtigfærg – 1900
 Gamle Århusgader 1.-2 – 1900
 århus mosaik – 1967
 Århus mosaik. Personer og begivenheder i den lille by – 1967
 Århus-profiler – 1974
 Biblioteks- og kulturliv i Århus – 1977

References

1891 births
1980 deaths
People from Aarhus
Danish librarians
20th-century Danish non-fiction writers
Danish male writers
20th-century non-fiction writers
Male non-fiction writers